Siobhan Wescott is an American educator who is Professor of American Indian Health at the Nebraska Medical Center College of Public Health. She was previously Director of the Indians into Medicine program at the University of North Dakota, where she trained hundreds of Native American physicians. In 2022, she was included by Stat News on their definitive list of leaders in the life sciences.

Early life and education 
Wescott is Alaskan Athabaskan. She grew up in a 400 square foot cabin near Fairbanks, Alaska. She was inspired to become a physician after attending a public health conference in Anchorage, Alaska. She believed that the representation of Native Americans would strengthen medical research and practice. Wescott studied government at Dartmouth College. After completing her undergraduate degree, she started working for Tom Daschle, senator for South Dakota. She was appointed a Henry M. Jackson Leadership Fellow in the Senate Committee on Indian Affairs. Disenchanted by her time in Washington, D.C., Wescott returned to Alaska. She eventually moved to California, where she earned a master's degree in public health from the University of California. At the age of thirty five, Wescott earned her medical degree from the Harvard Medical School. She joined the faculty there and established the Four Directions Summer Research Program. The program looked to support Native American undergraduates find medical careers.

Research and career 
In 2019, Wescott joined the University of North Dakota at Director of the Indians into Medicine program. She became concerned above the shortage of Native American physicians. At the time it was estimated that medical faculty members who identify as Native American or Alaska Natives made up 0.1% of those nationwide. She trained Native American physicians. She worked with the American Medical Association and the Association of American Indian Physicians to organize an annual summit that looks to diversify those who consider careers in medicine.

Wescott was the first person appointed Director of American Indian Health at the Nebraska Medical Center College of Public Health in 2021, where she holds the Dr. Susan and Susette (Inshata Theumba) LaFlesche Professorship. The professorship is named after two La Flesche sisters from the Omaha Tribe who were public health advocates. In this role she looks to end health inequities and improve the trust of Native American in physicians. One of her first activities was to encourage Native Americans to create a memorial quilt to honor those in their communities who had lost their lives to COVID-19.

In 2022, Stat News included Wescott as one of the leaders in the life sciences on their definitive list.

Selected publications

References 

Living people
Dartmouth College alumni
People from Fairbanks, Alaska
University of North Dakota faculty
American women educators
Alaskan Athabaskans
Year of birth missing (living people)
UCLA School of Public Health alumni
Harvard Medical School alumni